Sean O'Mahony may refer to:

 Seán O'Mahony (1872–1934), Irish politician
 Sean O'Mahony (Gaelic footballer), Irish sportsperson
 Sean O'Mahony (journalist) (1932–2020), British music writer